"La liberté pour Rêver" and "La liberté pour parler" are essays  written in French by French Nobel laureate J. M. G. Le Clézio and translated into English as  "Freedom to Dream" and "Freedom to Speak" and published by World Literature Today .

1965 essays
Essays by J. M. G. Le Clézio
Works by J. M. G. Le Clézio